SS Ultonia was a British passenger-cargo vessel built in 1898 in Wallsend-on-Tyne by C. S. Swan & Hunter. It was sunk by a German torpedo in 1917.

History 
Originally launched for cargo and cattle, it was fitted with third-class accommodation for 675 passengers in 1899, launching its first passenger voyage on 28 February from Liverpool to Queenstown to Boston.

Departing Boston on one of these voyages on 5 August 1899, the Ultonia hit a ledge just outside the main channel of Boston Harbor at Nantasket Roads, which was the typical route at the time.

In 1902, it was refitted to accommodate 120 second-class passengers, and 2,100 third-class passengers, increasing its tonnage to 10,402 gross. In 1915, it was refitted to carry up to 2,000 horses.

On 27 March 1917, Ultonia collided with the British collier  in the Atlantic Ocean. Don Benito sank.

Sinking 
During World War I, Ultonia was torpedoed and sunk in the Atlantic Ocean 190 miles from Fastnet, Ireland, on 27 June 1917 by the Imperial German Navy submarine SM U-53 under Captain Hans Rose. One life was lost in the attack.

See also
List of the largest ships hit by U-boats in World War I
List of shipwrecks in June 1917
William Thomas Turner

References

Ships built by Swan Hunter
Ships built on the River Clyde
1898 ships
Passenger ships of the United Kingdom
Ships of the Cunard Line
Maritime incidents in 1917
Ships sunk by German submarines in World War I
World War I shipwrecks in the Atlantic Ocean